The 2019–20 Syed Mushtaq Ali Trophy was the eleventh season of the Syed Mushtaq Ali Trophy, a Twenty20 cricket tournament in India. It was contested by 38 teams, divided into five groups, with eight teams in Group D. The group stage started on 8 November 2019. The top two teams from Group D progressed to the Super League section of the competition.

On 7 November, after a selection controversy, Mumbai sacked two of their selectors and formed a "adhoc" selection panel made of three other selectors. Mizoram cricket team's captain Abrar Kazi was arrested after allegedly fixing matches in the Karnataka Premier League. Three rain-affected matches from the first day of the tournament were rescheduled to take place on 18 November 2019.

Following the conclusion of matches played on 17 November 2019, Mumbai and Haryana had progressed to the Super League stage of the tournament.

Points table

Fixtures

Round 1

Round 2

Round 3

Round 4

Round 5

Round 6

Round 7

Round 8

References

Syed Mushtaq Ali Trophy
Syed Mushtaq Ali Trophy
Syed Mushtaq Ali